Rūdolfs Ronis (7 March 1897 – 30 March 1970) was a Latvian wrestler. He competed in the Greco-Roman lightweight event at the 1924 Summer Olympics.

References

External links
 

1897 births
1970 deaths
People from Otepää Parish
People from Kreis Dorpat
Olympic wrestlers of Latvia
Wrestlers at the 1924 Summer Olympics
Latvian male sport wrestlers